Severe Tropical Cyclone Trevor was a powerful and large tropical cyclone that caused major damages across Papua New Guinea, Northern Territory and Queensland during March 2019. The twentieth tropical low, seventh tropical cyclone, and fourth severe tropical cyclone of the 2018-19 Australian region cyclone season, Trevor originated from a tropical low that formed to the east of Papua New Guinea.

Meteorological history

A moderate to strong pulse of the Madden–Julian oscillation (MJO) moved into the Maritime Continent during March 2019. This aided the formation of a weak monsoonal trough to the north of Australia, which would help any tropical cyclone located in the area move southward toward the country. Although, the MJO soon weakened and no longer played an influence of tropical weather. This was due to other climate influences overshadowing the weakening MJO. Global forecasting models came into agreement that the MJO would continue to no longer be discernible over Trevor's lifespan.

On March 11, the Bureau of Meteorology (BOM) noted that a tropical low had formed over the Solomon Sea near Papua New Guinea. The Joint Typhoon Warning Center (JTWC) first issued a Tropical Cyclone Formation Alert (TCFA) at 1:30 UTC on March 15, while the disturbance was located roughly 270 miles east-northeast of Port Moresby, Papua New Guinea. The agency noted that the system was growing a tightening low-level center and deep convection. Within an area of moderate vertical wind shear and warm sea surface temperatures, the low began to strengthen.

Preparations and impact

New Guinea
In Papua New Guinea, a strong wind warning was put in effect for coastal areas between the Gulf of Papua and the Torres Strait. Due to the wet weather Trevor brought to Port Moresby, the first day of the 2018–19 ICC T20 World Cup East Asia-Pacific Qualifier had to be delayed.

Trevor caused destruction across Goodenough Island. 591 residences were partially damaged, while 463 residences were fully damaged. A primary school was damaged by high winds, forcing classes to be cancelled for several weeks. On the island, 20% of gardens growing food were damaged by Trevor. The staff houses at a clinic in Yauyaula were mangled. In Kilia Ward, a church was destroyed by powerful winds. Fish ponds on the island were demolished by the cyclone.

Australia

As a precaution, roughly 1,400 people were forced to evacuate to shelters in rural parts of the Northern Territory. This was the largest evacuation in the area since Cyclone Tracy in 1974. A state of emergency was issued for the territory on 21 March. The Carpentaria Highway, Roper Highway, Barkly Stock Route, and the Tablelands Highways were shut down.

As the storm made landfall on the Cape York Peninsula, the entire town of Coen lost electricity while nearby Aurukun reported isolated power outages. The Iron Range National Park received extensive damage from the storm with numerous trees being flattened.

Retirement
Due to the impact in Northern Queensland caused by the storm, the name Trevor was retired and will never be used again for an Australian region tropical cyclone. It will be replaced by Trung upon the next list repeat.

See also

Tropical cyclones in 2019
Weather of 2019
Cyclone Veronica – Another cyclone that formed around the same time as Trevor made landfall, and reached a similar intensity
Cyclones Lam and Marcia (2015) – the first tropical cyclones to threaten Australia at the same time

References

External links

Australian Bureau of Meteorology
Indonesian Agency for Meteorology, Climatology and Geophysics (in Indonesian)
Joint Typhoon Warning Center

2018–19 Australian region cyclone season
Category 4 Australian region cyclones
T
Retired Australian region cyclones